Uccello is an Italian surname. Notable people with the surname include:

Antonina Uccello (1922–2023), American politician
Julian Uccello (born 1986), Canadian soccer player
Luca Uccello (born 1997), Canadian soccer player
Paolo Uccello (1397–1475), Italian painter and mathematician

Italian-language surnames